Merle Tottenham (22 January 1901 – 18 July 1958) was a British stage and film actress. Her stage work included the original West End production of Noël Coward's Cavalcade in 1931; and she reprised her role as Annie the servant in the subsequent Hollywood film, in 1933. She also appeared as Dora, the maid in Night Must Fall (1937) with Robert Montgomery and Rosalind Russell, and the film version of Coward's This Happy Breed (1944), as Edie, the maid.

Partial filmography

 Immediate Possession (1931, Short) - Polly Baxter
 Down Our Street (1932) - Rose
 Here's George (1932) - Perkins
 Cavalcade (1933) - Annie
 Bondage (1933) - Ruth
 Paddy the Next Best Thing (1933) - Maid
 The Invisible Man (1933) - Millie
 The Night Club Queen (1934) - Alice Lamont
 Borrowed Clothes (1934) - Minor Role (uncredited)
 Youthful Folly (1934)
 Sporting Love (1936) - Maid
 Chick (1936) - Maid
 The Man in the Mirror (1936) - Mary (uncredited)
 Night Must Fall (1937) - Dora
 Bank Holiday (1938) - Milly
 Over the Moon (1939) - Maid (uncredited)
 Dead Men Are Dangerous (1939) - Gladys
 A Girl Must Live (1939) - College inmate
 Goodbye, Mr. Chips (1939) - Nellie, maid to Mr & Mrs Chipping (uncredited)
 Poison Pen (1939) - Mrs. Kemp
 The Young Mr. Pitt (1942) - Maid at Lord Auckland's (uncredited)
 We Dive at Dawn (1943) - (uncredited)
 Headline (1943) - Mrs. Deans
 This Happy Breed (1944) - Edie
 Love Story (1944) - Bus Conductoress (uncredited)
 I Didn't Do It (1945) - Tessie
 Caravan (1946) - Tweeny (uncredited)
 My Brother Jonathan (1948) - Alice Rudge
 Calling Paul Temple (1948) - Millie
 The Weaker Sex (1948) - Woman in Fish Queue (uncredited)
 Sleeping Car to Trieste (1948) - Miss Smith (uncredited)
 It's Hard to Be Good (1948) - Mrs. Hobson (uncredited)
 The Twenty Questions Murder Mystery (1950) - Mrs. Tavy's Neighbour (uncredited)
 Room to Let (1950) - Alice
 The Woman in Question (1950) - Neighbour (uncredited) (final film role)

References

External links
 
 

1901 births
1958 deaths
British stage actresses
British film actresses
20th-century British actresses
People from Quetta